Highland Township may refer to:

Arkansas
 Highland Township, Sharp County, Arkansas, in Sharp County, Arkansas

Illinois
 Highland Township, Grundy County, Illinois

Indiana
 Highland Township, Franklin County, Indiana
 Highland Township, Greene County, Indiana
 Highland Township, Vermillion County, Indiana

Iowa
 Highland Township, Clayton County, Iowa
 Highland Township, Greene County, Iowa
 Highland Township, Guthrie County, Iowa
 Highland Township, O'Brien County, Iowa
 Highland Township, Palo Alto County, Iowa
 Highland Township, Tama County, Iowa
 Highland Township, Union County, Iowa, in Union County, Iowa
 Highland Township, Wapello County, Iowa
 Highland Township, Washington County, Iowa
 Highland Township, Winneshiek County, Iowa, in Winneshiek County, Iowa

Kansas
 Highland Township, Clay County, Kansas
 Highland Township, Harvey County, Kansas
 Highland Township, Jewell County, Kansas
 Highland Township, Lincoln County, Kansas, in Lincoln County, Kansas
 Highland Township, Morris County, Kansas, in Morris County, Kansas
 Highland Township, Washington County, Kansas, in Washington County, Kansas

Michigan
 Highland Township, Oakland County, Michigan
 Highland Township, Osceola County, Michigan

Minnesota
 Highland Township, Minnesota

Missouri
 Highland Township, Lewis County, Missouri
 Highland Township, Oregon County, Missouri

Nebraska
 Highland Township, Adams County, Nebraska
 Highland Township, Gage County, Nebraska

North Dakota
 Highland Township, Cass County, North Dakota, in Cass County, North Dakota
 Highland Township, Hettinger County, North Dakota, in Hettinger County, North Dakota
 Highland Township, Sheridan County, North Dakota, in Sheridan County, North Dakota

Ohio
 Highland Township, Defiance County, Ohio
 Highland Township, Muskingum County, Ohio

Pennsylvania
 Highland Township, Adams County, Pennsylvania
 Highland Township, Chester County, Pennsylvania
 Highland Township, Clarion County, Pennsylvania
 Highland Township, Elk County, Pennsylvania

South Dakota
 Highland Township, Brown County, South Dakota, in Brown County, South Dakota
 Highland Township, Brule County, South Dakota, in Brule County, South Dakota
 Highland Township, Charles Mix County, South Dakota, in Charles Mix County, South Dakota
 Highland Township, Day County, South Dakota, in Day County, South Dakota
 Highland Township, Lincoln County, South Dakota, in Lincoln County, South Dakota
 Highland Township, Minnehaha County, South Dakota, in Minnehaha County, South Dakota
 Highland Township, Perkins County, South Dakota, in Perkins County, South Dakota

Township name disambiguation pages